"Otha Fish" is a song by American hip-hop group The Pharcyde, released September 16, 1993 through Delicious Vinyl Records. The song was the fourth single released from the group's 1992 debut album Bizarre Ride II the Pharcyde. The single peaked at number 35 on the US Dance Sales chart.

The song, produced by Slimkid3 and L.A. Jay, was also sampled by the American band Lovage for their song "Everyone Has A Summer" on Music to Make Love to Your Old Lady By.

It sampled the song “Today” by the jazz flautist Herbie Mann on the 1966 album Today!.

Music video 
A music video for the song was released on December 3, 2006, by the official channel of Delicious Vinyl.

Track listing

A-Side 

 Otha Fish (Video Edit)
 Otha Fish (L.A. Jay Remix)
 Otha Fish (Video Edit Instrumental)

B-Side 

 Otha Fish (The Angel Remix)
 Passin' Me By (Fly As Pie Mix)

Charts

References 

1993 singles
1992 songs
The Pharcyde songs
Delicious Vinyl singles